Trevor Etienne is an American football running back for the Florida Gators. Etienne is the younger brother of NFL player Travis Etienne.

High school career 
Etienne attended Jennings High School in Jennings, Louisiana. During his high school career, Etienne rushed for 2,455 yards and 34 touchdowns. As a senior, he recorded 1,344 rushing yards along with 20 touchdowns and was named to the All-American Bowl Roster.  A top running back in the class of 2022, Etienne committed to play college football at the University of Florida over offers from Clemson and LSU.

College career 
In Etienne's first collegiate game, he would tally 63 yards on five carries, before rushing for his first career touchdown the following week against Kentucky. Against USF, he would rush for the go-ahead touchdown in a 31-28 victory. Etienne would go on to score touchdowns against LSU and Georgia. He rushed for 719 yards and six touchdowns as a freshman in 2022, and was named to the SEC All-Freshman Team.

References

External links 

 Florida Gators bio

Living people
American football running backs
Florida Gators football players
People from Jennings, Louisiana
Players of American football from Louisiana
African-American players of American football
Year of birth missing (living people)